Officer Buckle and Gloria is a 1995 picture book by Peggy Rathmann that won the 1996 Caldecott Medal. Based on a 2007 online poll, the National Education Association listed the book as one of its "Teachers' Top 100 Books for Children." It was one of the "Top 100 Picture Books" of all time in a 2012 poll by School Library Journal. The animated adaptation, narrated by John Lithgow and animated by Chris Larson, was released in 1997 by Weston Woods Studios.

Plot summary
A rather boring police officer named Officer Buckle is assigned to take a police dog named Gloria to his safety speech at the local school. Until that time, whenever Officer Buckle tried to tell schools about safety everyone fell asleep. Then, unbeknownst to Officer Buckle (literally, behind his back), Gloria does tricks imitating the safety tip demonstrating safety rules. Gloria is a big success! Officer Buckle enjoys the fame until he sees on a taped speech that the schoolchildren are so enthusiastic because of Gloria. He refuses to teach safety and a huge accident happens. A letter from an attentive and sweet girl, named Claire, convinces Officer Buckle to start teaching again. In the end, Officer Buckle and Gloria go to many schools and teach the students about safety together.

References

1995 children's books
Children's fiction books
American picture books
Caldecott Medal–winning works
Law enforcement in fiction
Police dogs in fiction